

Play (1959)

Organizations

Film (1962)

Organizations

Guilds

Film festivals

Television film (1979)

Organizations

Guilds

Television film (2000)

Organizations

Guilds

Lists of accolades by film

External links